William Humphreys Jackson (October 15, 1839 – April 3, 1915) represented Maryland's 1st congressional district in the United States House of Representatives from 1901 to 1905 and from 1907 to 1909.  His son, William P. Jackson, was a U.S. Senator from Maryland.

Jackson was born near Salisbury, Maryland, and engaged in agricultural pursuits.  In 1864, he engaged in the manufacture of lumber in Salisbury, and was elected as a Republican to Congress from the Maryland's 1st congressional district, serving two full terms from March 4, 1901, to March 3, 1905.  He was an unsuccessful candidate for reelection in 1904, but was successful two years later in 1906, serving another term for the 1st district from March 4, 1907, to March 3, 1909.  He was again an unsuccessful candidate for reelection in 1908, and resumed lumber manufacturing in Salisbury.  He died in Salisbury, and is interred in Parsons Cemetery.

References

1839 births
1915 deaths
People from Salisbury, Maryland
Republican Party members of the United States House of Representatives from Maryland
19th-century American politicians